George Wallace Donald Crosby, OAM (29 October 1924 – 3 December 1985) was an Australian actor of radio, stage, television and film, radio producer, stage manager, airman and trade unionist, the fifth child of actor Joseph Alexander (Marshall) Crosby and Theresa Crosby (formerly King). He was named after his father's friend, the actor and comedian George Stevenson Wallace. At the age of one, he was taken on stage by his father in a production of the operetta His Royal Highness. At age 12, he started producing radio sketches at the Australian Broadcasting Corporation (ABC, then known as the Australian Broadcasting Commission).

Biography
After leaving school, he continued acting and worked in insurance. After World War II broke out, he served as an air gunner in the Royal Australian Air Force. In 1945, aged 21, he travelled to London and worked as an assistant stage manager in the West End, when he was offered a scholarship to study at the Royal Academy, after which he worked throughout England in repertory. In 1949 he returned to Sydney and married Elizabeth Teresa Glover. He appeared in Doris Fitton's production of Dark of Night, and numerous other productions in Sydney and Melbourne. Entering radio in 1949, he had a successful career not only as an actor but also as a producer. 

When television arrived in Australia in 1956, he easily made the transition to the new medium, featuring in plays, again at the ABC. According to Richard Lane:
For all his success on stage, it was on television and later in film that his greatness in developing characterisation was fully revealed. His was a craggy face that could sometimes be humorous, often grim or judicial, but always sensitive. 
He moved to commercial television, appearing in serials made by Crawford Productions, such as Ryan, Division 4, Matlock Police and Homicide. In 1968, he played the role of Mervyn in Tony Hancock's doomed Australian series, which was shelved upon Hancock's suicide and later released as a TV movie in 1972.

With his craggy features, Crosby was often compared to British superstar Sir John Mills. In radio, another popular role was in the long-running Gwen Meredith drama serial Blue Hills. More stage roles followed and he was celebrated for his appearances in works by Steele Rudd. In film, his credits include Newsfront, Little Boy Lost, The Picture Show Man and the indigenous rights film The Chant of Jimmie Blacksmith. His later television work included roles in The Young Doctors and A Country Practice.

He was one of Australia's most distinguished actors and radio producers, with a career spanning all genres including stage, film, radio and television. He urged the use of Australian actors where possible and spoke out against cuts in ABC funding. In 1980, he was awarded an OAM, and in 1985 he received the Australian Film Institute's Longford Lyell Award for services to the industry.

Crosby served for a time as the President of The Actors' Benevolent Fund of NSW, a charity assisting performers and entertainers in times of dire circumstance. In 1975, Crosby facilitated a donation of $500 from the Benevolent Fund of NSW, to seed a new charity of a similar kind in Queensland. This group became The Actors & Entertainers Benevolent Fund of Queensland, and was founded by Alan Edwards AM.

He was a trade unionist and was president of Actors Equity of Australia from 1976 until his death from a myocardial infarction in 1985 in the Sydney suburb of Potts Point. He was survived by his wife, three sons, who are also in the industry as actors and film directors and a daughter. He was 61.

Dons son Matthew Crosby acted in A Drop in the Ocean.

References

1924 births
1985 deaths
Male actors from Sydney
Australian male radio actors
Australian male television actors
Australian male stage actors
Australian male film actors
20th-century Australian male actors
Alumni of RADA
Royal Australian Air Force personnel of World War II
Royal Australian Air Force airmen